Katherine Winifred "Kate" Norby (born August 1, 1976) is an American actress.

Norby's filmography includes Rob Zombie's horror film The Devil's Rejects.  She has guest-starred in many television series, including Mad Men,  and had recurring roles in Boston Public, Nip/Tuck and Swingtown.

Filmography

Film

Television

References

External links

1976 births
Living people
American film actresses
American television actresses
Actors from Oak Park, Illinois

21st-century American women